This is a list of listed buildings in the civil parish of Cathcart, Scotland. Although parishes ceased to be used for administrative purposes in 1930, Historic Scotland continue to use them and burghs for the purposes of geographically categorising listed buildings. The parish includes areas that were historically split between the counties of Renfrew and Lanark, and are today in the council areas of Glasgow and East Renfrewshire. However, as Historic Scotland categorise buildings within former burgh boundaries under that location rather than their parish, this list only covers the portion of Cathcart parish that was not within the Glasgow burgh boundary.

List 

|}

Key

See also 
 List of listed buildings in East Renfrewshire
 List of listed buildings in Glasgow for buildings in the Glasgow burgh part of Cathcart parish

Notes

References
 All entries, addresses and coordinates are based on data from Historic Scotland. This data falls under the Open Government Licence

Clarkston